Boone Newspapers, Incorporated (BNI) is the parent company of a publishing business that includes dozens newspapers as well as magazines, other published materials, and internet properties in the United States. It is a private company and owns papers in smaller cities in Alabama, Georgia, Kentucky, Louisiana, Tennessee, Texas, Michigan, Mississippi, Minnesota, North Carolina, Ohio and Virginia. The company is based in Tuscaloosa.

Todd H. Carpenter is chief executive officer and James B. Boone, Jr. is chairman of the board. Boone and his family own all of the company's stock according to its website.

After owning Tuscaloosa Newspapers Inc., Boone's father eventually took over the company and purchased additional papers. In 2014, Boone Newspapers bought several newspapers from Evening Post Industries.

Newspapers
Boone Newspapers include:
 The (Danville) Advocate-Messenger
 Albert Lea Tribune
 Alexander City Outlook
 (Lake Charles) American Press
 The Andalusia Star-News
 Atmore Advance
 Austin Daily Herald
 Bogalusa Daily News
 The Brewton Standard
 Cassopolis Vigilant
 Claiborne Progress
 The Clanton Advertiser
 Clemmons Courier
 The Davie County Enterprise-Record
 The (Fergus Falls) Daily Journal
  The (Brookhaven) Daily Leader
 The Demopolis Times
 The Dowagiac Daily News
 Edwardsburg Argus
 Elizabethton Star
 Franklin County Times
 The Greenville Advocate
 The Harlan Daily Enterprise
 Hartselle Enquirer
 The Interior Journal
 Ironton Tribune
 The Jessamine Journal
 LaGrange Daily News
 (LaPlace) L'Observateur
 The Lowndes Signal
 Luverne Journal
  The (Troy) Messenger
 Middlesboro Daily News
 The Natchez Democrat
 Niles Daily Star
 The Orange Leader
 The Oxford Eagle
 The Pelham Reporter
 Picayune Item
 The Port Arthur News
 Roanoke-Chowan News-Herald
 Salisbury Post
 Selma Times-Journal
 The Shelby County Reporter
 Southwest Daily News
 The (Frankfort) State Journal
 Suffolk News-Herald
 The Tallassee Tribune
 Tidewater News
 Tryon Daily Bulletin
 Valley Times-News in Lanett, Alabama, purchased in 2017
 The Vicksburg Post
 Washington Daily News
 The Wetumpka Herald
 The Winchester Sun

References

Companies based in Tuscaloosa, Alabama
Newspaper companies of the United States